Jack Sullivan (11 August 1933 – 2 September 2002) was an Australian rules footballer who played with Carlton in the Victorian Football League (VFL).

Notes

External links 

Jack Sullivan's profile at Blueseum

1933 births
2002 deaths
Carlton Football Club players
Australian rules footballers from Victoria (Australia)